Olom-Kyuyole (Olom-Küöl) is a rural locality (a selo) in Emissky Rural Okrug of Amginsky District in the Sakha Republic, Russia, located  from Amga, the administrative center of the district, and  from Emissy, the administrative center of the rural okrug. Its population as of the 2010 Census was 13; up from 9 recorded in the 2002 Census. Previously known as Olom, it was given its present name on March 4, 1999.

References

Notes

Sources
Official website of the Sakha Republic. Registry of the Administrative-Territorial Divisions of the Sakha Republic. Amginsky District. 

Rural localities in Amginsky District